This is a list of honorary degree recipients from the University of Waterloo.



A

B

C

D

E

F

G

H

I

J

K

L

M

N

O

P

R

S

T

U
 Jane Urquhart DLitt (1997)

V

W

Y

Z

References

Sources
 Honorary degrees granted | Secretariat | University of Waterloo

University of Alberta
Canada education-related lists
Lists of Canadian people